New Delhi is a 1987 Malayalam language neo-noir action thriller film written by Dennis Joseph and directed by Joshiy and produced by Joy Thomas. It stars Mammootty, Suresh Gopi, Thiagarajan, Sumalatha, Urvashi, Siddique, Vijayaraghavan, Mohan Jose, Devan, and Jagannatha Varma.

The film was remade and released in Telugu as Anthima Theerpu, which was directed by Joshiy himself. Joshiy also directed the Hindi and Kannada versions titled New Delhi. Lead roles were played by Jeetendra in its Hindi version and Ambareesh in the Kannada version, respectively, Gopi made his debuts in the Telugu, Kannada and Hindi film Industries through the remakes in those languages but he played different roles. The story is loosely based on the novel The Almighty by Irving Wallace.

Thiagarajan, who played the role of Salem Vishnu in New Delhi, later produced and directed a Tamil film titled Salem Vishnu which showcased the prequel story of his character. The film rose Mammootty to Mega Star status after consecutive failures in the early 80s. The film was a critical and commercial success and the highest-grossing Malayalam film at that time. It earned cult status and is considered one of the best films ever made in India.

Plot
G. Krishnamoorthy aka G.K., is a cartoonist and investigative journalist working in New Delhi, along with his sister, Uma, who is also a journalist. G.K. falls in love with a dancer named Maria Fernandes. Meanwhile, C. R. Panikkar and Shankar are two political bigwigs, who book a show with Maria on Republic Day's eve and brutally assault her in a hotel room. G.K. attempts to report the incident in the newspaper, but the effort is foiled by his chief editor, who notifies C.R. Panikkar and Shankar. After being arrested on fake charges, G.K. is brought to trial to face many false witnesses including Fernandes, her father, who claims nobody harmed his daughter. 

G.K. is deemed mentally unfit and sentenced to 1 year in a mental asylum, as well as 5 years in prison. G.K. is mercilessly tortured, subjected to electric shock, and beaten up to the point where his right limbs become useless, under Shankar's orders to make sure this man will never write or walk properly again. G.K. meets Ananthan, Siddiq and Appu, whom he acquainted at the jail, and were once selected to be set free from prison on Republic day, but was denied the chance by Shankar. Nataraj Vishnu is a murderer who was sentenced to death by the court. G.K., who already has a plan of vengeance, meets Vishnu and offers to help him break out of prison. 

After completing the 5-year period, G.K. is free. Maria is ready with a new newspaper The New Delhi Diary  which she dedicates to G.K, and arranged help for Vishnu, Ananthan, Siddiq, and Appu to break out of prison. G.K. delays the issuing of his newspaper even though the newspaper had all the facilities and trained journalists, including Uma and her fiancée Suresh. G.K. wants his newspaper to release only after getting sensational news, and also informs that he has appointed a reporter named Viswanath who will provide available sensational news to him. When the team breaks out of jail, they head towards the residence of former judge and newly appointed ambassador to USA, Mr. Aggarwal who had sentenced G.K. to prison, and kill him according to G.K.'s instructions. 

The newspaper is released immediately and has a grand reception by the people since this sensational news. The New Delhi Diary soon becomes the leading newspaper in India. Uma and Suresh have doubts about the news being published in their newspaper so early by the "unknown" reporter Viswanath. G.K. instructs the  four to kill C. R. Panikkar, who is electrocuted and killed, the torturing method G.K. faced in the mental asylum. The killing is witnessed by Suresh and team notices it. G.K. instructs the team to kill Suresh, who has some evidences and photos about this. G.K., who later discovers Uma's relationship with Suresh, tries to rescue him, but to no avail. 

Siddiq is killed while Appu is captured by the cops. The last prey of G.K.'s series of killings was Shankar, who is a Central minister. As usual, G.K. instructs Ananthan and Vishnu to kill Shankar, and publishes a news about Minister Shankar's murder, but the team could not cross the tight security to kill him. They were both killed in an encounter with police. G.K., who was all set to release his next day's newspaper, is arrested by the police for conspiring to attack Shankar. Shankar comes to the office of G.K. to harass him. Soon, Maria shoots Shankar with the pistol as vengeance. The cops try to lock her, but she kills him anyway. Thus, Maria and G.K. are arrested by the cops.

Cast

Production
The film was shot in New Delhi.

Remake
The movie was remade into three different languages such as Telugu, Hindi & Kannada by Joshiy himself.

Release
The film released on 24 July 1987. It was a commercial success at the box office. New Delhi became the highest-grossing Malayalam film at that time. New Delhi making a box office collection of ₹ 2.5 crore in Kerala box office. The film ran for over a hundred days in Ernakulam center. and also was the first Malayalam film to ran over 100 days in 2 centers in Tamil Nadu box office.

References

External links
 

1987 films
1980s Malayalam-language films
Films about corruption in India
Films scored by Shyam (composer)
Films set in Delhi
Films shot in Delhi
Malayalam films remade in other languages
Fictional portrayals of the Delhi Police
Films directed by Joshiy
Films with screenplays by Dennis Joseph
Journalism adapted into films